Christoph Benning (born 1960) is a German–American plant biologist. He is an MSU Foundation Professor and University Distinguished Professor at Michigan State University. Benning's research into lipid metabolism in plants, algae and photosynthetic bacteria, led him to be named Editor-in-Chief of The Plant Journal in October 2008.

Early life and education
Benning was born in Soest, Germany, in 1960. He completed his Master of Science degree at the University of Freiburg before moving to North America for his PhD at Michigan State University (MSU). During his time at the University of Freiburg, Benning received a 10-month
international travel fellowship from the German Scholarship Foundation.

Career
Following his PhD, Benning remained in Michigan while his wife Susanne Hoffmann–Benning finished her PhD work with Hans Kende. In 1993, he accepted a leadership position at the Institute for Gene Biology Research in Germany before moving back to MSU as an assistant professor in the Department of Biochemistry and Molecular Biology in 1998. Upon joining the faculty at MSU, Benning's research focused on a mutant version of Arabidopsis called DGD1. In his laboratory, Benning and his postdoctoral fellow mapped the mutation to find the broken gene DGD1. They then isolated it to provide insights into the assembly of the thylakoid lipid matrix and subcellular lipid trafficking in Arabidopsis thaliana. He later found that while plants will die without the TGD4 protein, a defective version of the protein will cause them to accumulate excess oil in their leaves. As such, farmers could utilize more of the plant than just their seeds. Benning then focused this theory into modifying rutabaga to churn out more oil and store it throughout the plant. 

Benning's research into lipid metabolism in plants, algae and photosynthetic bacteria, led him to be named Editor-in-Chief of The Plant Journal in October 2008. The following year, his research team licensed the technology that could enhance plants’ seed oil content for food and animal feed applications. Using this technology, Benning's laboratory showed that researchers could use an algae gene to engineer a plant that stores lipids or vegetable oil in its leaves. In August 2010, Benning was recognized as "an outstanding scientist who continues to make highly significant contributions to the field of plant lipid research" with the Terry Galliard Award at the International Symposium on Plant Lipids. He was later elected a Fellow of the American Association for the Advancement of Science in 2014 and promoted to MSU Foundation Professor in 2015. 

As an MSU Foundation Professor, Benning was also appointed director of MSU-DOE Plant Research Laboratory in August 2015 as the successor to Michael Thomashow. In this role, he received the 2018 MSU Innovator of the Year Award with John Ohlrogge for identifying the WRINKELD1 gene and developing its use to engineer plant oils and lipids. Following the 2018–19 academic year, Benning was promoted to University Distinguished Professor, the highest honor MSU could bestow onto a faculty member. He was later recognized in the 2019 Highly Cited Researchers List compiled by Clarivate Analytics for the first time. He was recognized again in 2021 and was also elected a Senior Member of the National Academy of Inventors. In November 2022, Benning's laboratory received a National Science Foundation grant to examine how the chloroplast reacts to stress responses in the model plant Arabidopsis thaliana.

References

External links

Living people
1960 births
People from Soest, Germany
20th-century American botanists
21st-century American botanists
Michigan State University faculty
Michigan State University alumni
University of Freiburg alumni
Scientific journal editors